Watchman Vadivel is a 1994 Indian Tamil-language film,  directed by A. Jagannathan and produced by Raadhika Reddy. The film stars Sivakumar, Sujatha, Anand Babu and Kasthuri. It is a remake of the Telugu film Surigaadu.

Plot 
Vadivel works as a watchman in a club. His wife Saro is a housewife. Both are doting parents to their only son, Raja who is a college student. What the couple does not know is that their son is someone who dreams of living a rich life and has no qualms about lying. He lies to his house owner who also has a mechanic shed that he would marry his daughter in due course and takes a different car everyday to college.

At college, he makes everyone believe that he is rich and his parents are NRI. He dates Radha, daughter of a millionaire, based on the lie. They eventually get married without him inviting his parents even. Radha relents when she finds out the truth but takes it in her stride as she too was greedy for the wealth and status which makes her unqualified to judge him. She, however, decides to respect her in-laws.

With a change of heart, Raja and Radha invite Vadivel and Saro to live with them. They too concede so that they can be with their son and grandson eventually. However, Raja and his father-in-law, gradually transform the couple to watchman and cook of the house getting rid of their servants. In due course, they get insulted and leave the house. They are in for a shock when they find that their house and the land has been taken over by Raja who has built an apartment their and sold the same. The whole change of heart was a ruse. Meanwhile, Saro has developed heart disease and needs treatment.

With all avenues closed, Vadivel sues Raja for him to payback all the money he took from them saying that since Raja never ever declared that Vadivel is his father in presence of anyone, he cannot claim that the money came as a duty of a parent. If Raja were to claim the parentage, he needs to do his duty of saving his mother's life. The judge understands the situation, makes him pay for the same with the threat of going to prison. Saro's life is saved but they both shun Raja and Vadivel returns to work vowing to trust and care about only himself and his wife.

Cast 

Sivakumar as Vadivelu
Sujatha as Saro
Anand Babu as Raja Manickam
Kasthuri as Radha
S. S. Chandran
Vadivelu
Vivek
LIC Narasimhan
Jai Ganesh
Delhi Ganesh
A. R. Srinivasan
Oru Viral Krishna Rao
 Thillai Rajan
 Bayilvan Ranganathan

Production 
This was Sivakumar's 175th film as an actor.

Soundtrack 

The soundtrack was composed by Deva. Lyrics were written by Vaali.

Reception 
New Straits Times wrote "Parents with ungrateful or troublesome children will love this movie".

References

External links 
 
 

1994 films
Indian drama films
Tamil remakes of Telugu films
Films scored by Deva (composer)
1990s Tamil-language films
1994 drama films
Films directed by A. Jagannathan